Methia falli is a species of beetle in the family Cerambycidae. It was described by Martin in 1920.

References

Methiini
Beetles described in 1920